Wolfgang Helbig (2 February 1839 – 6 October 1915) was a German classical archaeologist born in Dresden. He is known for his studies involving the wall paintings of Campania (Pompeii).

From 1856 to 1861 he studied philology and archaeology at the University of Göttingen, where he became member of Burschenschaft Hannovera (fraternity), and also at the University of Bonn, where he was a student of Otto Jahn, Friedrich Gottlieb Welcker and Friedrich Wilhelm Ritschl. He received his doctorate at Bonn in 1861 with the thesis "Questiones scaenicae". In 1862 he became a member of the German Archaeological Institute (DAI) to Rome. In 1865 he succeeded Heinrich Brunn as second secretary at the DAI, a position he kept until 1887.

During his career he traveled extensively throughout Italy, Greece, Russia, France and North Africa. Beginning in 1887, he lived in Rome as a private scholar and art dealer, and served as a broker of numerous works of art for the Ny Carlsberg Glyptotek in Copenhagen.

In 1887, he presented the for some time controversial Praeneste fibula. In 1892, he published the first edition of "Führer durch die öffentlichen Sammlungen klassischer Altertümer in Rom", a very popular guide to classical antiquities in Rome.

He died in 1915 in Rome.

Selected publications 
 Wandgemälde der vom Vesuv verschütteten Städte Kampaniens (Murals of the cities of Campania buried by Vesuvius), Leipzig 1868.
 Untersuchungen über die Campanische Wandmalerei (Studies of Campanian wall painting), Leipzig 1873. 
 Die Italiker in der Po-Ebene (The ancient Italic peoples of the Po River plain), Leipzig 1879. 
 Das homerische Epos, aus den Denkmälern erläutert (The Homeric epic, explained from the monuments), Leipzig 1884, second edition 1887.

Notes

References 
 This article is based on a translation of an equivalent article at the German Wikipedia, whose sources include Helbig, Wolfgang @ NDB/ADB Deutsche Biographie.

1839 births
1915 deaths
Archaeologists from Dresden
People from the Kingdom of Saxony
University of Göttingen alumni
University of Bonn alumni
German art historians
German male non-fiction writers